Stacey Dales (born September 5, 1979) is a Canadian former basketball player and a current reporter on the NFL Network.  Dales was born in Collingwood, Ontario, and raised in Brockville, Ontario.

Basketball
Before attending the University of Oklahoma, she attended Thousand Islands Secondary School (TISS) and Dales was a star for the TISS Pirates ladies basketball team during her high school years, Dales was a major reason why TISS captured three consecutive Ontario ‘AA’ high school senior girls basketball championships 1994, 1995 & 1996. After graduating in 1997 she attended the University of Oklahoma, Dales made an Olympic appearance for Canada in 2000 and was a first team All-American in 2001 and 2002. She was named the 2001 and 2002 Big 12 Conference Player of the Year and is the Big 12 all-time career assist leader (764). In 2002, she was the all-sports Academic All-American of the Year. She was the first Oklahoma player to record 1,700 points, 600 rebounds and 700 assists. During her senior year she led the Sooners to the NCAA Championship game where they lost to Connecticut.

Dales was drafted third overall in 2002 by the Washington Mystics, the highest pick ever for a Canadian. That year she was named to the All-Star team as a replacement. When she was with Washington, she was diagnosed with Raynaud's phenomenon in her hands. In 2004, she announced her retirement from the league for the first time.

After a one-year retirement, Dales joined the Chicago Sky, who picked her in the expansion draft of 2006 after Washington left her unprotected. On April 5, 2008, Dales announced her retirement from the WNBA for the second time.

Dales was inducted into Brockville's Hall of Fame in June 2016, alongside her brother Burke.

College statistics
Source

WNBA statistics
A 6'0" (183 cm) guard-forward, Dales played for the Washington Mystics and Chicago Sky. She ranked 4th in the WNBA for 3-pointers made (62) and 2nd in 3-point attempts (201) in 2007.

Television
From 2002 - 2008 Dales served as a men's and women's college basketball analyst, as well as a sideline reporter for college football and the NBA, on ESPN. Dales was the first female at ESPN to work as an in-studio men's basketball analyst. In August 2009 the NFL Network announced that it hired Dales to serve as host and national reporter/correspondent for NFL Media Programming. Dales is currently in her tenth year, entering her eleventh NFL season, with the NFL Network. For the 2010 Winter Olympics in Vancouver, Dales was hired by NBC Universal Sports to work as a correspondent. Dales has also served as a sideline reporter for TNT covering primetime NBA games as well as for CBS covering primetime NFL games. In 2018 and 2019 Dales was hired as a brand ambassador and spokesperson for Phillips 66 in connection with its long running partnership with the Big 12 Basketball Tournament. In 2018, Fox Sports announced that it hired Dales to serve as color analyst for women's college basketball coverage for the 2018–2019 season.

Personal life
Dales' brother Burke played 10 seasons in the Canadian Football League, retiring in 2014.  Her cousin, Jason Arnott, played 18 seasons in the NHL, retiring in 2013.

References

External links
Player Profile
Interview with The Oklahoman
Interview with New York Times
Involvement in animal welfare
Dales retires from the WNBA

1979 births
Living people
All-American college women's basketball players
Basketball people from Ontario
Basketball players at the 2000 Summer Olympics
Canadian expatriate basketball people in the United States
Canadian sports announcers
Canadian women's basketball players
Chicago Sky players
College basketball announcers in the United States
College football announcers
National Basketball Association broadcasters
National Football League announcers
Oklahoma Sooners women's basketball players
Olympic basketball players of Canada
Point guards
Sportspeople from Brockville
Sportspeople from Collingwood, Ontario
Washington Mystics players
Women's college basketball announcers in the United States
Women's National Basketball Association All-Stars
Women sports announcers